Viola Townsend Winmill (1891–1975) was an American sportswoman, foxhunter rider and coach driver. Between 1927 and 1935, Winmill was the master of the Warrenton Foxhunt.

Biography
Winmill, a race horse owner, was married to Robert Campbell Winmill. They bought a farm in 1922 in Warrenton and kept a number of race horses and hunters.

In 1968, Winmill displayed her 150 carriages collection to the Westmorland Davis Foundation. Following year, she donated a rare carriage to Morven Park. The carriage was built by Million & Guilet and was used by Grace Kelly during the making of the film The Swan.

Winmill Carriage Museum at Morven Park is named after her.

References

Further reading
 

1891 births
1975 deaths
American racehorse owners and breeders
American sportswomen